Lee Hyuk Ki (Hangul: 이혁기), better known as Loptimist (Hangul: 랍티미스트), is a South Korean rapper. He debuted in 2007 with the album, 22 Channels. He signed to record label Soul Company in 2008 and left in 2011 to join Jungle Entertainment. Loptimist has been praised for "broadening the spectrum of the hip hop genre."

Discography

Albums

Singles
 "Love Is Over" (2010)
 "Amazing Gift Vol. 1" (2011)
 "Ma Day" (2014)
 "지나가던 길에" (2014)
 "의심병" (2014)
 "돌아보기" (2014)
 "다시는" (2015)
 "아르페오" (2015)
 "Me" (2016)
 "Seoul Bossa Nova" (2016)
 "Yam Scene" (2016)
 "Che Bella" (2016)
 "Early Bird" (2016)
 "Beat Language" (2016)

Awards

Hiphopplaya Awards

References

1985 births
Living people
South Korean male rappers